Əmillər is a village in the Shusha District of Azerbaijan.

Populated places in Shusha District